Roger Ballard  (20 April 1943 - 30 September 2020) , British sociologist
 Roger Ballard, American singer-songwriter